Emmanuel Aboagye Didieye (23 November 1976 – 14 October 2017) was a medical doctor and a politician of the Republic of Ghana. He was a member of the 5th and 6th parliament of the 4th Republic of Ghana representing Bomasarefo Constituency in the Eastern Region of Ghana.

Early life and education 
He was born on 23 November 1976, and lived in Bomasarefo. He earned a degree from the Indian for-profit educational institution National Institute of Information Technology in 2004. He also had a Master in Public Administration Degree at Ghana Institute of Management and Public Administration in 2011.

Political career 
He was a member of the National Democratic Congress. Didieye was first elected into the parliament in the 2008 Ghanaian General Election, as a representative of Afram Plains North. He won reelection in 2012, but lost a party primary in 2015 and was succeeded in office by Betty Nana Effua Krosby Mensah.

Personal life 
He was married with one child and was a Christian who worshipped in The True Faith Church.

Death 
He fell into a coma in October 2017, and was moved to Trust Hospital in Accra, where he died on 14 October 2017, aged 41.

References

1976 births
2017 deaths
People from Eastern Region (Ghana)
National Democratic Congress (Ghana) politicians
Ghanaian MPs 2009–2013
Ghanaian MPs 2013–2017